The Squeeze is a 2015 feature film starring Jeremy Sumpter as Augie, a young golfer who just won the local tournament by 15 strokes and tied and broke the public course record during the tournament, and is seduced by a gambler to play golf for bet money. Everything goes well until he goes to Las Vegas and has his life and his family on the line on a high stake gambling scheme. The film was based on the real-life events of Keith Flatt.

The film was written and directed by Terry Jastrow, a senior producer of many golf tournaments, winner of 7 Emmy Awards and is recognized by his innovations on golf and sports television coverage.

Plot summary

Cast

References

External links
 
 
 
 
 

2015 films
2010s English-language films
2010s sports comedy-drama films
American sports comedy-drama films
Golf films
Films about gambling
Films set in the Las Vegas Valley
Comedy films based on actual events
Sports films based on actual events
2010s American films